The Kjøllsæter Bridge is a  long wooden deck truss bridge that crosses the river Renaelva in Åmot Municipality in Innlandet county, Norway. The bridge lies just northeast of the village of Rena and it connects two large military training areas that are part of the Rena Camp military base. It also gives the people living in Rød area a better road connection across the river.

The bridge was built to carry military vehicles and equipment such as tank guns and other heavy machines. The Kjøllsæter Bridge is one of the strongest wooden bridges in the world.

The Kjøllsæter bridge was opened 17 August 2006. Its total cost reached  equivalent at the time to about US$6 million.

References

Bridges in Innlandet
Bridges completed in 2006
Åmot